Sky Show was a channel on satellite TV, owned by Sky Italia and broadcast on channel 116.

The channel mainly had comedic content, including the show Shake It (produced by the channel itself), and Scherzi a parte taken from the Happy Channel.  Channel also featured sitcoms and international programs. Its slogan was Si fa per ridere (It makes for a laugh). On 21 April 2009 the channel was closed down after Sky Vivo was relaunched as Sky Uno. By 1 August 2015 they replaced the channel by a relaunched version of MTV Italy called MTV.it.

TV series
 Aída
 H
 Rodney
 Crumb
 Radio Sex
 Moonlighting
 Tre cuori in affitto
 Absolutely Fabulous
 Green Wing
 Sport Night
 Weeds
 Cuori senza età
 Birra e patatine
 Samantha Oups!

Show
 Shake It
 Geppi Hour
 Scherzi a parte Remix
 Seven Show

Films
 Funny and Gay movies (every Friday evening at 9 pm - 2007)

Reality shows
 Since January 12, 2009 it has been broadcasting Grande Fratello 9 live 24 hours a day

Sky Italia
Defunct television channels in Italy
Italian-language television stations
Television channels and stations established in 2006
Television channels and stations disestablished in 2009
2006 establishments in Italy
2009 disestablishments in Italy